The following is a production discography of Lil Jon.

Amerie - Touch
03. "Touch"

Baby Bash - Cyclone
02. "Cyclone" (featuring T-Pain)

Britney Spears - Blackout
00. "Pull Out"

Brooke Valentine - Chain Letter
01. "Girlfight" (featuring Lil Jon & Big Boi)

Bun B - Trill
06. "Trill Recognize Trill" (featuring Ludacris)

Ciara - Goodies
01. "Goodies" (featuring Petey Pablo)
13. "Goodies (Remix)" (featuring T.I. & Jazze Pha)

Ciara - The Evolution
01. "That's Right" (featuring Lil Jon)
07. "C.R.U.S.H."

Da Brat - Unrestricted
02. We Ready

David Banner - Mississippi: The Album
03. Might Getcha (featuring Lil Jon)

David Banner - Certified

02. Treat Me Like  (featuring Jadakiss)

Dizasta - Untitled
04. "What Dat Do?" (Remix) (featuring Lil Jon, DJ Khaled, T-Pain & Ace Hood)

E-40 - Breakin News
09. "Anybody Can Get It" (featuring Lil Jon & The Eastside Boyz, Bone Crusher & David Banner)

E-40 - My Ghetto Report Card
02. "Tell Me When to Go" (featuring Keak Da Sneak)
03. "Muscle Cars" (featuring Keak Da Sneak & Turf Talk)
11. "White Gurl" (featuring UGK & Juelz Santana)
13. "U and Dat" (featuring T-Pain & Kandi Girl)
14. "I'm Da Man" (featuring Mike Jones & Al Kapone)
15. "Yee" (featuring Too Short & Budda)
18. "Gimme Head" (featuring Al Kapone & Bosko)
19. "She Says She Loves Me" (featuring 8Ball & Bun B)

E-40 - The Ball Street Journal
03. "Break Ya Ankles" (featuring Shawty Lo)
08. "Hustle" (featuring Turf Talk & Rock City)
10. "40 Water"
14. "Earl" (featuring Ice-T)

Fat Joe - All or Nothing
14. "Lean Back (Remix)" (featuring Lil Jon, Mase & Eminem)

Ice Cube - Laugh Now, Cry Later
10. "Go to Church" (featuring Lil Jon & Snoop Dogg)
18. "You Got Lotta That" (featuring Snoop Dogg)
20. "Holla @ Cha Boy"

Janet Jackson - Call on Me (Remixes)
 "Call on Me" (with Nelly) (Lil Jon Remix)

Juvenile - Reality Check
14. "Why Not" (featuring Skip)

Kurupt - Streetlights
10. Riot in the Club

Lil Scrappy - Bred 2 Die Born 2 Live
01. "I'm Back"
05. "Been A Boss"
06. "Gangsta, Gangsta" (featuring. Lil Jon)
10. "Born To Live" (featuring Rick Ross & Brisco)
15. "Police"
20. "Oh Yeah (Work)" (featuring. Sean P. Of The YoungBloodZ & E-40)

Lil Scrappy - The King of Crunk & BME Recordings Present: Trillville & Lil Scrappy
11. "Crank It"  
12. "What the Fuck"  
13. "Head Bussa" (featuring Lil Jon)
14. "Bootleg" 
15. "No Problem" 
16. "Dookie Love Public Service Announcement" 
17. "F.I.L.A. (Forever I Love Atlanta)" (featuring Lil Jon)
18. "Crunk Radio" 
19. "Diamonds in My Pinky Ring"  (featuring Big Nod and Kaskit)
20. "Be Real" (featuring Bohagon)
21. "Gone" (featuring Bohagon)

MC Hammer - Look Look Look 
03. "YAY"

Mario - Turning Point
04. "Boom" (featuring Juvenile)

Mickey Avalon - "What Do You Say - Single"
01. "What Do You Say" (featuring Dirt Nasty, Cisco Adler, Andre Legacy)

Mobb Deep - Amerikaz Nightmare
09. "Real Gangstaz" (featuring Lil Jon)

Moochie Mack - Broke Pimpin'''==
04. "Quit Actin' Like Dat" (featuring Lil' Jon)

==Nappy Roots - Wooden Leather==
15. "What Cha Gonna Do? (The Anthem)"

==Nivea - Complicated==
03. "Okay" (featuring Lil Jon & Youngbloodz)

==Petey Pablo - Still Writing in My Diary: 2nd Entry==
03. "Jam Y'all"
04. "Freek-a-Leek"
11. "U Don't Want Dat" (featuring Lil Jon)

==Pitbull - M.I.A.M.I.==
01. "305 Anthem" (featuring Lil Jon)
02. "Culo" (featuring Lil Jon)
03. "She's Freaky"
04. "Shake It Up" (featuring Oobie)
05. "Toma" (featuring Lil Jon)
11. "That's Nasty" (featuring Lil Jon & Fat Joe) (Produced by Dj Nasty)

==Pitbull - El Mariel==
16. "Voodoo"
19. "Bojangles (Remix)" (featuring Lil Jon & Ying Yang Twins)

==Pitbull - The Boatlift==
06. "Ying and the Yang"
07. "The Anthem" (featuring Lil Jon)
10. "Sticky Icky" (featuring Jim Jones)

==Pitbull - Rebelution==
03. "I Know You Want Me (Calle Ocho)"
11. "Krazy" (featuring Lil Jon)

==P$C - 25 to Life==
06. "I'm a King" (featuring Lil Scrappy)

==Rasheeda - GA Peach==
00. "Rocked Away" (featuring Lil Scrappy)

==Ricky Martin - Life==
3. "I Don't Care"

==Snoop Dogg - R&G (Rhythm & Gangsta): The Masterpiece==
09. "Step Yo Game Up" (featuring Lil Jon & Trina)

== Snoop Dogg - Malice n Wonderland ==
04. "1800" (featuring Lil Jon)
 
==T.I. - Urban Legend==
16. "Stand Up" (featuring Lil Jon, Trick Daddy, & Lil Wayne)

==T.I. - I'm Serious==
18. "I'm Serious (Remix)" (featuring Bone Crusher, Pastor Troy, YoungBloodZ and Lil Jon)

== Trick-Trick - The Villain ==
 10. "Let it Fly" (featuring Ice Cube)

== Tha Dogg Pound - That Was Then, This Is Now ==
10. "No'mo' Police Brutality"

==The-Dream - Love vs. Money==
 14. "Let Me See the Booty" (featuring Lil Jon)

==Too Short - Married to the Game==
03. "That's How It Goes Down" (featuring Oobie)
04. "You Can't Fuck With Us" (featuring N.O.R.E. & Petey Pablo)
05. "Shake That Monkey" (featuring Lil Jon)
06. "Burn Rubber"
07. "Hey, Let's Go" (featuring Cutty Cartel & Devin the Dude)

==Too Short - Blow the Whistle==
02. "Blow the Whistle"
03. "Burn Rubber Pt 2"
06. "Money Maker" (featuring Pimp C & Rick Ross)
13. "Sadity" (featuring Tha Dogg Pound)
15. "It's Time to Go"
16. "Shake It Baby"

==Trillville - The King of Crunk & BME Recordings Present: Trillville & Lil Scrappy==
01. "Trillville Radio"  
02. "Neva Eva" (featuring Lil Jon & Lil Scrappy)
03. "Get Some Crunk in Yo System" (featuring Pastor Troy)
04. "Goodbye"  
05. "Weakest Link"   
06. "Bathroom"   
07. "Bitch Niggaz" (featuring Lil Scrappy)
08. "Dookie Love"  
09. "Some Cut"  (featuring Cutty)
10. "The Hood"  (featuring Lil Jon)

==Usher - Confessions==
 02. "Yeah!" (featuring Lil Jon & Ludacris)
 19. "Red Light"

==Waka Flocka Flame - Flockaveli==
 16. "Smoke, Drank" (featuring Mouse & Kebo Gotti)

==Young Buck - Straight Outta Cashville==
08. "Shorty Wanna Ride"

==Young Buck - Buck the World==
12. "Money Good"

==YoungBloodZ - Drankin' Patnaz==
02. "Damn!" (featuring Lil Jon)

==YoungBloodZ - Ev'rybody Know Me==
02. "Presidential"

==UGK - Underground Kingz''
 10. "Like That"

Produced singles
 2002: "I Don't Give a Fuck" (featuring Mystikal & Krayzie Bone)
 2003: "Get Low" (featuring Ying Yang Twins)
 2003: "Damn!" (Youngbloodz featuring Lil Jon)
 2003: "Salt Shaker" (Ying Yang Twins featuring Lil Jon)
 2003:  " Come Get Some" TLC featuring Lil Jon)
 2003: "Quick to Back Down" (Bravehearts featuring Nas and Lil Jon)
 2004: "Yeah!" (Usher featuring Lil Jon & Ludacris)
 2004: "Culo" (Pitbull featuring Lil Jon)
 2004: "Toma" (Pitbull featuring Lil Jon)
 2003: "Freek-A-Leek" (Petey Pablo)
 2004: "Goodies" (Ciara featuring Petey Pablo)
 2004: "Real Gangstaz" (Mobb Deep featuring Lil Jon)
 2004: "Head Bussa" (Lil Scrappy featuring Lil Jon)
 2004: "Neva Eva" (Trillville featuring Lil Jon & Lil Scrappy)
 2004: "No Problem" (Lil Scrappy)
 2004: "Some Cut" (Trillville featuring Cutty)
 2004: "Shorty Wanna Ride" (Young Buck)
 2004: "What U Gon' Do" (featuring Lil Scrappy)
 2004: "Lovers and Friends" (featuring Usher & Ludacris)
 2004: "Real Nigga Roll Call" (featuring Ice Cube)
 2005: "Girlfight"  (Brooke Valentine featuring Lil Jon & Big Boi)
 2005: "Boom" (Mario featuring Juvenile)
 2005: "Presidential" (YoungBloodz)
 2005: "Touch" (Amerie)
 2005: "Okay" (Nivea featuring Lil Jon & YoungBloodZ)
 2005: "I'm A King" P$C (Featuring T.I.)
2005: "I Don't Care" (Ricky Martin featuring Fat Joe and Amerie)
 2006: "Tell Me When To Go" (E-40 featuring Keak Da Sneak)
 2006: "U and Dat" (E-40 featuring T-Pain & Kandi Girl)
 2006  "Blow The Whistle" (Too Short)
 2006: "Snap Yo Fingers" (featuring E-40 & Sean P)
 2006: "Bojangles (remix)" (Pitbull featuring Lil Jon & Ying Yang Twins)
 2006: "Go to Church" (Ice Cube featuring Lil Jon & Snoop Dogg)
 2006: "Gangsta Gangsta" (Lil Scrappy featuring Lil Jon)
 2007: "Oh Yeah (Work)" (Lil Scrappy featuring Sean P & E-40)
 2007: "Cyclone" (Baby Bash featuring T-Pain)
 2007: "That's Right" (Ciara featuring Lil Jon)
 2007: "The Anthem" (Pitbull featuring Lil Jon)
 2007: "Throw Some D's (Remix)"  (Rich Boy featuring André 3000, Jim Jones, Murphy Lee, Nelly & The Game) 
 2008: "Turf Drop" (E-40)
 2008: "Untitled" (Ciara featuring Lil Jon)
 2008: "Dat Baby" (Shawty Putt featuring Lil Jon)
 2008: "Booty" (The-Dream co-produced by Lil Jon)
 2008: "That's How I Go" (Baby Bash featuring Mario)
 2009: "Get Up on It" (Mams Taylor featuring Lil' Kim & The Game)
 2009: "Krazy" (Pitbull featuring Lil Jon)
 2009: "I Know You Want Me (Calle Ocho)" (Pitbull)
 2011: "Twisted" (Gorilla Zoe)
 2011: "Hard White (Up In The Club)" (Yelawolf)

References 

Production discographies
Hip hop discographies

Discographies of American artists